Sadio Tounkara (born 27 April 1992) is a Malian professional footballer who plays as a midfielder.

Playing career

Club
Tounkara played for a Mali academy from the age of 12 to 15, before signing for then signed for Malian Second Division side Jeanne d'Arc, earning promotion to the Malian Première Division for the 2008/09 season. During the winter of the 2011–12 season, Tounkara signed for Azerbaijan Premier League side Khazar Lankaran.
After leaving Enosis Neon Paralimni, Tounkara spent six-months without a club before being linked with a return to the Azerbaijan Premier League with AZAL, signing a six-month contract, with an optional year, with AZAL on 1 December 2016.

On 4 September 2017, Zira FK announced the signing of Tounkara on a two-year contract.

On 27 February 2020, Tounkara signed a one-year contract with Estonian club Narva Trans.

On 13 January 2021, Tounkara signed for Keşla until the end of the 2020–21 season.

Career statistics

Honours

Club 
 Khazar Lankaran
 Azerbaijan Supercup: 2013

References

External links 

1992 births
Living people
Malian footballers
Malian expatriate footballers
Association football midfielders
Khazar Lankaran FK players
Enosis Neon Paralimni FC players
AZAL PFK players
Zira FK players
JK Narva Trans players
Shamakhi FK players
Azerbaijan Premier League players
Cypriot First Division players
Meistriliiga players
Expatriate footballers in Azerbaijan
Expatriate footballers in Cyprus
Expatriate footballers in Estonia
Malian expatriate sportspeople in Cyprus
21st-century Malian people
Malian expatriate sportspeople in Estonia
Malian expatriate sportspeople in Azerbaijan